Ehsan Metro Station is the northern terminus of Shiraz Metro Line 1. The station opened on 11 October 2014. It is located on western end of Ma'aliabad Boulevard at Ehsan Square.

Shiraz Metro stations
Railway stations opened in 2014